Gladys Mary Wilson, Baroness Wilson of Rievaulx (12 January 19166 June 2018) was an English poet and the wife of Harold Wilson, who twice served as British prime minister.

Life 
She was born in Diss, Norfolk, the daughter of the Reverend Daniel Baldwin, who was a Congregationalist minister. She attended boarding school at Milton Mount College near Crawley, leaving aged 16 to attend a secretarial course for two years. She was employed as a stenographer at Lever Brothers in Port Sunlight before marrying Harold Wilson on New Year's Day 1940. She and Wilson had two sons, Robin (born 1943) and Giles (born 1948).

In 1970, her volume of poetry Selected Poems was published, and, in 1976, Wilson was one of three judges of the Booker Prize, the other judges being Walter Allen and Francis King. According to the Dictionary of National Biography entry for Harold Wilson, written by Roy Jenkins, Mary was not satisfied with life in politics. It was this detachment which gave the Private Eye spoof "Mrs Wilson's Diary", the supposed diary of Wilson, written in the style of the BBC's daily radio serial Mrs Dale's Diary, a spurious look of authenticity.

Politically, she opposed her husband in the 1975 European Communities membership referendum by voting against continued membership and in her support for the Campaign for Nuclear Disarmament.

Mary was widowed on 24 May 1995 when her husband died of colorectal cancer and Alzheimer's disease after ten years of illness. They were married for 55 years. She continued to live in Westminster, a short distance from Downing Street. She retained the couple's holiday home in the Isles of Scilly.

In 2013, at age , she accepted an invitation to the funeral of Margaret Thatcher.

Death
Lady Wilson died on 6 June 2018 of a stroke, at St Thomas' Hospital in London (aged 102), having outlived her husband by 23 years. The longest-lived spouse of a British prime minister, she was the first to live beyond the age of 100 years. A private service followed by cremation took place on mainland Britain, and her ashes were buried with her husband at Old Town Churchyard in St Mary's, Isles of Scilly.

Publications

References

Further reading

External links
 
 
 

1916 births
2018 deaths
20th-century English poets
20th-century English women writers
British anti–nuclear weapons activists
Wilson of Rievaulx
English centenarians
English women poets
People from Diss, Norfolk
Spouses of prime ministers of the United Kingdom
Spouses of life peers
Harold Wilson
Women centenarians